Sukabumi Regency is a regency (kabupaten) in southwestern Java, as part of West Java province of Indonesia. The regency seat is located in Palabuhan Ratu, a coastal district facing the Indian Ocean. The regency fully encircles the administratively separated city of Sukabumi. Covering an area of 4,145.70 km2, the regency is the largest regency in West Java and the second largest regency on Java after the Banyuwangi Regency in East Java. The regency had a population of 2,341,409 at the 2010 census and 2,725,450 at the 2020 census; the official estimate as at mid 2021 was 2,761,476 with a large part of it living in the northeastern part of the regency that encircles Sukabumi City, south of Mount Gede. A plan to create a new regency, the North Sukabumi Regency is currently waiting for the approval of the central government.

Sukabumi is strategically located south of Jabodetabek and west of Bandung Metro, two largest metropolitan area in Indonesia. Geologically, the regency is at the western end of Cimandiri Fault which split the northern plateau and the southern hilly areas. Its southern region is less populated and contains a high level of biodiversity and significant geological heritage, acknowledged in 2015 by UNESCO with the declaration of Ciletuh-Palabuhanratu Geopark located in the southwestern coast of the regency.

History

Early history
The area around Sukabumi was already inhabited at least in the 11th century. The first written record found in this area was the Sanghyang Tapak inscription in Cibadak district, 20 km west of Sukabumi. Written in Kawi script, the stone tells about the prohibition of fishing activity in the nearby river by the authorities of the Sunda Kingdom. Another written record found is the undeciphered Pasir Datar Inscription in the Cicantayan subdistrict.

After the fall of Sunda Kingdom in 1579, most of present-day Sukabumi Regency was under the control of Sumedang Larang, while the area west of Mount Gede was controlled by the Banten Sultanate. In 1620, King Aria Suriadiwangsa of Sumedang Larang declared his kingdom as part of Mataram Sultanate. During this era, Dipati Ukur, the local ruler of present-day Bandung revolted against Mataram after the failed Siege of Batavia. The revolt triggered migration of people from Sumedang Larang to move and settle the area around Palabuhanratu and Jampang to protect themselves from the approaching Mataram troops.

After Sultan Agung died in 1645, the Priangan region slowly breaking away from Mataram influence. In 1674, Trunajaya rebellion started in Madura and greatly weakened Mataram. Sukabumi which was still a part of Cianjur was declared itself independent from Mataram under the leadership of Wiratanu I in 1677, when Trunajaya forces sacked the Plered Palace in Mataram's capital. The Sultanate itself was officially ceded Priangan region west of Citarum to the VOC on October 20, 1677, by an unequal treaty between Amangkurat II and Maetsuycker, as a compensation for Dutch assistance to quell the Trunajaya rebellion. By that time, there were only few rural Sundanese settlements existed, one of the largest was Cikole. Under the leadership of Sultan Ageng Tirtayasa, Banten tried to reclaim Priangan between 1677 and 1683 via an invasion of Cianjur, however his effort was ultimately failed when Banten descended into civil war between Ageng and his crown prince Abdul Kahhar.

Colonial era 
The inland and coastal areas of Sukabumi were first explored by Europeans at the end of the 17th century, when VOC planned to open plantations throughout Priangan. The first Dutch expedition was led in 1687 by Pieter Scipio van Oostende into the remnant of Pakuan and ended on Wijnkoopsbaai (present-day Palabuhanratu). The next expeditions were led by Adolf Winkler in 1690, and governor-general Abraham van Riebeeck in 1703, 1704, and 1709. In the 1709 expedition Van Riebeeck passed through Mount Gede and visited southern Sukabumi to check the progress of coffee cultivation in that area. One of the first coffee plantation opened by Van Riebeeck was located in present-day Gunungguruh subdistrict. The first coffee harvest was officially sent on April 14, 1711, by Tjiandjoer regent Wiratanu III. In 1723, The coffee plantation areas in Sukabumi were grown, along with the enlargement of Tjiandjoer Regency during the administration of Hendrick Zwaardecroon.

Formation
The regency was originally carved out from the colonial era-Tjianjoer Regency. It was then part of the Priangan Residency (Residentie Preanger Regentschappen). In 1776, the regent of Tjianjoer Wiratanu Datar VI created a kepatihan (viceregency) named Tjikole Viceregency which consisted the districts of Goenoengparang, Tjimahi, Tjiheoelang, Tjitjoeroeg, Djampangtengah and Djampangkoelon with its administrative center in Tjikole (now part of Sukabumi).

On January 13, 1815, under the British rule, the Tjikole Viceregency renamed as Soekaboemi Viceregency. The name Soekaboemi was proposed by a Dutch surgeon and plantation owner named Dr. Andries de Wilde, who owned a plantation and resided in the viceregency. The origin of the name came from the combination of two Sanskrit words, Soeka (happiness, likely) and Boemi (earth, land). Thus Soekaboemi could be translated as "Likable Land".

In 1921, by the decree of Governor General Dirk Fock, Tjiandjoer Regency was divided into two regencies which were Tjiandjoer and Soekaboemi regency, effective from June 1, 1921. The first regent of Soekaboemi was R. A. A. Soerianatabrata, who also held position as Sukabumi's last viceregent. He held this position until 1930. From 1926 to 1931, Soekaboemi served as the capital of the short-lived West Priangan Residency.

Geography
The regency borders the Cianjur Regency in the east, Bogor Regency in the north, Lebak Regency in the west, and the Indian Ocean in the south.

Beaches
Along the southern coast of the regency there are several beaches such as Pasir Putih Beach (Cipanarikan estuary), Pangumbahan Beach (also known as Turtle Beach), Cibuaya Beach and Ujunggenteng Beach. Batununggul Beach is suitable for surfing with average wave height approximately 3 meters in dry season, but only 1 meter in rainy season.

Waterfalls
The 120-meters Caweni Waterfall is located only 200 metres from Cidolog road, about 70 kilometres south of Sukabumi and about 25 kilometres from Sagaranten District.

The Cikaso Waterfall (Ciniti Waterfall) is located in Jampang Kulon district, 1.5 hours drive (70 kilometres) from Sukabumi City. The waterfall height is 80 metres; it consists of 3 waterfalls, from left to right Asepan Waterfall, Meong Waterfall and Aki Waterfall.

Culture
Sukabumi with Cianjur is a part of western Parahyangan cultural region, a fertile mountainous region of West Java home to the Sundanese people.

Traditional festivities
The local people hold the Ocean Fiesta every year on 5 April in Pelabuhan Ratu Beach. There is also Ngabungbang tradition in Cisukawayana river estuary on every full moon of each month in early morning. Ngabungbang or Mass ritual bath is a pre-Islamic tradition since 175-205 BC when King Hyang Brahma ruled Medang Gali (Galuh) Kingdom and continued by Prabu Siliwangi from Sunda Kingdom until now.

Administrative districts
As at 2021, Sukabumi Regency is divided into forty-seven districts (kecamatan), listed below with their areas and their populations at the 2010 census and the 2020 census, together with the official estimates as at mid 2021. These exclude the further seven districts which are within the city of Sukabumi (and thus administratively outside the regency). The table also includes the locations of the district administrative centres, the number of villages (rural desa and urban kelurahan) in each district, and its postal code.

Notes: (a) Of the 47 district capitals, 5 are classed as urban kelurahan (Surade, Palabuhanratu, Cibadak, Cicurug and Jampang Kulon) while the other 42 are rated as rural desa. (b) Ciemas District includes five small offshore islands - Pulau Gotor, Pulau Karanghantu, Pulau Kunti, Pulau Mandra and Pulau Manuk.(c) except the village of Caringin, with a post code of 43154. (d) except the village of Nagrak, with a post code of 43132, and the village of Sukasari, with a post code of 43134.
The proposed creation of a new North Sukabumi Regency (Kabupaten Sukabumi Utara) will comprise 21 of the above districts from the existing Sukabumi Regency. These 21 districts are indicated by asterisks (*) in the above table.''

References

External links
 Sukabumi Regency official site
 Situ gunung north of Sukabumi
 Info Sukabumi